Bon Jovi Live! was a concert tour by rock band Bon Jovi. Staged in support of the band's thirteenth studio album Burning Bridges, the tour played arenas and open-air venues in 2015. It began on September 11, 2015, in Jakarta, Indonesia at the Gelora Bung Karno Stadium and continue throughout Asia, ending on October 3, 2015 in Tel Aviv, Israel at Yarkon Park. It was the band's first tour without guitarist Richie Sambora.

Shows

Cancelled shows

Set list 
 "That's What the Water Made Me"
 "You Give Love a Bad Name"
 "Raise Your Hands"
 "Born to Be My Baby"
 "We Weren't Born to Follow"
 "Lost Highway"
 "Runaway"
 "Because We Can"
 "We Got It Going On"
 "It's My Life"
 "What About Now"
 "We Don't Run"
 "Captain Crash & The Beauty Queen From Mars"
 "Someday I'll Be Saturday Night"
 "Wanted Dead or Alive"
 "I'll Sleep When I'm Dead"
 "Who Says You Can't Go Home"
 "Keep the Faith"
 "Bad Medicine"
Encore:
 "In These Arms"
 "Have a Nice Day"
"Livin' on a Prayer"

Personnel 
Band
Jon Bon Jovi - lead vocals, guitar, maracas
David Bryan - keyboards, backing vocals
Tico Torres - drums, percussion
Phil X - lead guitar, talkbox, backing vocals
Hugh McDonald - bass, backing vocals
 Matt O'Ree – rhythm guitar, backing vocals

References

External links 

 

2015 concert tours
Bon Jovi concert tours